Banba is an album released by Irish folk group Clannad in 1993 on BMG records. It was re-issued in 2005 with the Afterlife mix bonus track of "I Will Find You". Banba was nominated for a Grammy Award for Best New Age Album, but was the runner-up to Spanish Angel by Paul Winter Consort.

Track listing 
 "Na Laethe Bhí" –- 5:20
 "Banba Óir" – 3:26
 "There for You" – 4:10
 "Mystery Game" – 4:24
 "Struggle" – 4:04
 "I Will Find You" (Theme from the 1992 film The Last of the Mohicans) – 5:16
 "Soul Searcher" – 4:25
 "Caidé Sin do'n Té Sin" – 4:22
 "The Other Side" – 4:18
 "Sunset Dreams" – 4:12
 "A Gentle Place" (instrumental) – 3:11
 "I Will Find You" (Afterlife Mix) (only on 2005 reissue album) – 3:40

Charts

Singles
 "Mystery Game"

Credits
 All songs were written by Ciarán Brennan except "Sunset Dreams" by Noel Duggan.
 Produced by Ciarán Brennan.
 Frankie Kennedy appears as a guest musician on flute.
 The album sleeve was designed and art directed by Bill Smith Studio with photography by Anton Corbijn.

Certifications and sales

References

External links
 This album at Northern Skyline

1993 albums
Clannad albums
RCA Records albums